ONE on Prime Video 5: de Ridder vs. Malykhin (also known as ONE Fight Night 5) was a Combat sport event produced by ONE Championship. It that took place on December 3, 2022, at the SM Mall of Asia Arena in Pasay, Philippines.

Background
The event competition was announced couple from live ONE on Prime Video 2 by a welterweight bout between former KSW Welterweight and Middleweight Champion Roberto Soldić and undefeated contender Murad Ramazanov.

A ONE Light Heavyweight World Championship bout between current champion Reinier de Ridder (also current ONE Middleweight World Champion) and current interim ONE Heavyweight champion Anatoly Malykhin headlined the event.

A ONE Featherweight Kickboxing World Championship bout between current champion Superbon Singha Mawynn and former K-1 Super Welterweight Champion (also 2022 ONE Featherweight Kickboxing World Grand Prix Champion) Chingiz Allazov was expected to take place at the event. The pairing was previously scheduled to co-main event at ONE on Prime Video 2, but Allazov forced to withdraw from the event due to an injury. In turn, Superbon forced to withdraw due to came down with an illness and the bout was moved to headline at ONE on Prime Video 6 on January 14, 2023.

A ONE Women's Atomweight Muay Thai World Championship unification bout between current champion Allycia Rodrigues and interim champion Janet Todd was expected to take place at the event. However on November 30, Todd pulled out from the event due to tests positive for COVID-19 and the bout was postponed.

A ONE Lightweight Submission Grappling World Championship bout between current champion Kade Ruotolo (also the 2022 ADCC World Championship 77kg gold medalist) and promotional newcomer Matheus Gabriel that took place the event.

At the weigh-ins, Jackie Buntan fails hydration four times and must negotiate a catchweight; she weighed in at 130 pounds, 5 pounds over the strawweight limit. The bout proceeded at catchweight with Buntan being fined 20% of his purse, which went to his opponent Amber Kitchen.

Results

Bonus awards 
The following fighters were awarded bonuses:

Performance of the Night ($100,000): Anatoly Malykhin
Performance of the Night ($50,000): Edson Marques and Tye Ruotolo

See also 

 2022 in ONE Championship
 List of ONE Championship events
 List of current ONE fighters

References 

Events in Metro Manila
Sports in Metro Manila
ONE Championship events
2022 in mixed martial arts
Mixed martial arts in the Philippines
Sports competitions in the Philippines
December 2022 sports events in the Philippines